Bachelor's Hope may refer to:
Bachelor's Hope (Centreville, Maryland), listed on the NRHP in Maryland
Bachelor's Hope (Chaptico, Maryland), listed on the NRHP in Maryland